Zhang Junfang (fl. 7th century) was a Tang dynasty poet.  A native of Nanyang, Henan, he flourished as a poet under the reigns of the Emperors Taizong and Gaozong.

References

Tang dynasty poets
Writers from Nanyang, Henan
Poets from Henan
7th-century Chinese poets